Terry Kinney (born January 29, 1954) is an American actor and theater director, and is a founding member of the Steppenwolf Theatre Company, with John Malkovich, Laurie Metcalf, Gary Sinise, and Jeff Perry. Kinney is best known for his role as Emerald City creator Tim McManus on HBO's prison drama Oz.

Early life
Kinney was born in Lincoln, Illinois, the son of Elizabeth L. (née Eimer), a telephone operator, and Kenneth C. Kinney, a tractor company supervisor.

He attended Illinois State University, in Normal, Illinois, where he became friends with Jeff Perry, who took him to see a performance of Grease featuring Gary Sinise, bringing the three Steppenwolf Theatre Company co-founders together for the first time.

Career

Theatre
Kinney has been involved in theatre since 1974, when he, Gary Sinise and Jeff Perry founded the Steppenwolf Theatre Company. In describing the company's radical usage of cinematic techniques such as accelerated time, substantial soundtracks and the rough equivalent of dissolves and bleeds, Kinney had said:We’ve always been more influenced by cinematic techniques than stage techniques because stage techniques have been around long enough to become really boring and cliché. Our earliest influences were the films of Cassavetes, not any plays we’d seen. We always tend to score our pieces and we always tend to manipulate the audience to look where we want them to look and the way to do that is to get very tight on certain situations.He has directed several plays (see below) and performed in several. In 1985 he performed in the Drama Desk Award winning play Balm in Gilead by Lanford Wilson. In 1996 Kinney played Tilden in the Sam Shepard play Buried Child directed by Gary Sinise in New York City. During a performance of Buried Child Kinney had a "terrible, horrible, screaming panic attack" and stayed offstage for several years, only returning in 2002 in a performance with Kurt Elling called Petty Delusions and Grand Obsessions. He directed Richard Greenberg's play Well Appointed Room in 2006 and Neil Labute's reasons to be pretty in 2009. In 2010 he directed another Lanford Wilson play, Fifth of July for Bay Street Theatre (July) and for the Williamstown Theatre Festival (August).

In October–November 2012 Kinney directed Checkers a new play by Douglas McGrath at the Vineyard Theatre, New York City. He directed Lyle Kessler's new play Collision in January 2013 at Rattlestick Playwrights Theater.

Film and television
Besides his theatrical work, Kinney has done much acting, mainly for television, starting in 1986 with an appearance in Miami Vice.  In 1987, he starred as Pastor Tom Bird in the CBS miniseries Murder Ordained opposite JoBeth Williams. He is perhaps best known for his portrayal of the idealistic unit manager Tim McManus on HBO's prison drama Oz.

In 1995, Kinney co-starred with Tommy Lee Jones in an adaptation of an Elmer Kelton western novel titled The Good Old Boys. Tommy Lee Jones directed this made-for-TV movie which also co-starred Sissy Spacek, Matt Damon, Sam Shepard, Wilford Brimley and retired Texas Ranger H. Joaquin Jackson.

Kinney also directed two episodes of Oz, "Cruel and Unusual Punishments" in 1999 and "Wheel of Fortune" in 2002. Explaining the experience, he said, "it was great training for shooting on a limited budget, on a time crunch."

His film work includes a role in the 1988 film Miles from Home, which featured many cast members of Steppenwolf and was directed by Sinise. In 1995, he played mayoral candidate Todd Carter in Carl Franklin's film Devil in a Blue Dress. In 1996, Kinney played a comedic role as Uncle David in the coming-of-age drama, Fly Away Home. In 1999, Kinney played the lead in the indie film, The Young Girl and the Monsoon, about Hank, a 39-year-old photo-journalist dealing with a demanding job and a growing daughter. In 2001, he played the estranged father of the protagonist, Sara Johnson (Julia Stiles), in the film Save the Last Dance.

In 2006 Kinney directed a short film (18 minutes) called Kubuku Rides (This Is It), which portrays the effects of drug addiction of a mother as seen by her young son. The film is based on the short story by Larry Brown. It is the first film produced by Steppenwolf Films. In 2008, he directed Diminished Capacity, a feature film with a big Steppenwolf presence, based on the Sherwood Kiraly novel of that name.

For television, in 2008, Kinney was Deputy Attorney General Zach Williams in Canterbury's Law, a short-lived Fox series. In 2009, he played Sergeant Harvey Brown in the ABC series, The Unusuals, and in the same year he had a recurring role as Special Agent Sam Bosco on the hit CBS series, The Mentalist.

2010 saw a pilot for a CBS drama called The Line, starring Dylan Walsh as ATF Agent Donovan with Kinney as a complex criminal, Alex Gunderson, that Donovan is hunting. The series was to be based on a novel by Robert Gregory Browne called "Kiss Her Goodbye". (Browne said that the show was tentatively called "ATF".) In 2011 Kinney had a recurring role in the North American adaptation of Being Human as Heggemann, an 1,100-year-old Dutch vampire. In April 2012 he starred in the CBS police procedural drama NYC 22 as Field Training Officer Daniel "Yoda" Dean. However, after four episodes NYC 22 was axed. Kinney also guest starred as Salvatore Amato, a member of a Chicago crime family, in the new Fox drama The Mob Doctor premiering in September 2012.

Kinney was cast as a series regular on ABC drama series Black Box opposite Kelly Reilly and Vanessa Redgrave, set to air on ABC in 2014.

Since 2016 Kinney has played Hall, a recurring character in the TV series Billions. In 2019, Terry was cast in the Shonda Rhimes mini-series Inventing Anna alongside Julia Garner, Laverne Cox, and Anna Chlumsky. The series, which depicts Instagram-famous scam artist Anna Sorokin, premiered on Netflix in 2022.

Personal life
From 1984 to 1988, Kinney was married to Elizabeth Perkins. From 1993 to 2005, he was married to his Oz co-star Kathryn Erbe, with whom he has a daughter, Maeve (b. 1995), and a son, Carson (b. 2003).

Kinney lives in Brooklyn, New York.

Theater directing credits

Filmography

Film

Television

References

External links

BOMB Magazine interview with Terry Kinney by Craig Gholson (Spring, 1989)

1954 births
American male film actors
American male television actors
American theatre directors
Illinois State University alumni
Living people
Male actors from Illinois
People from Lincoln, Illinois
Steppenwolf Theatre Company players
People from Brooklyn